The Sparkassen Cup is an annual indoor track and field competition which takes place in February in Stuttgart, Germany. The meeting was first held at the Hanns-Martin-Schleyer-Halle in 1987 and is currently an IAAF Indoor Permit Meeting.

At each meeting, the two male and female athletes deemed to have given the best performance each receive the Sparkassen Cup – a metal figurine of a man or a woman respectively. The recipients are often those who have broken records at the meeting. Indeed, Hicham El Guerrouj's 1997 run in the 1500 metres and Meseret Defar's winning time for the 3000 metres in 2007 remain world records on the indoor track.

World records
Over the course of its history, numerous world records have been set at the Sparkassen Cup.

Meeting records

Men

Women

References

External links
 Official website
 Sparkassen Cup Records

IAAF Indoor Permit Meetings
Athletics competitions in Germany
Recurring events established in 1987
Sports competitions in Stuttgart
1987 establishments in West Germany